Thomas E. Riker (born February 28, 1950) is an American former professional basketball player for the New York Knicks of the National Basketball Association (NBA). He was a 6'10", 225 lb. center.

Riker was selected 8th overall in the 1972 NBA draft by the New York Knicks out of the University of South Carolina, and played three seasons for the Knicks from 1972 to 1975.

Riker was also selected in the 1972 ABA Draft by the Carolina Cougars.

External links
NBA stats @ basketballreference.com

1950 births
Living people
All-American college men's basketball players
Allentown Jets players
American men's basketball players
Basketball players from New York (state)
Centers (basketball)
New York Knicks draft picks
New York Knicks players
Parade High School All-Americans (boys' basketball)
People from Rockville Centre, New York
South Carolina Gamecocks men's basketball players
Sportspeople from Nassau County, New York